Francis Sowerby Macaulay FRS (11 February 1862, Witney – 9 February 1937, Cambridge) was an English mathematician who made significant contributions to algebraic geometry. He is known for his 1916 book The Algebraic Theory of Modular Systems (an old term for ideals), which greatly influenced the later course of commutative algebra. Cohen–Macaulay rings, Macaulay duality, the Macaulay resultant and the Macaulay and Macaulay2 computer algebra systems are named for Macaulay.

Macaulay was educated at Kingswood School and graduated with distinction from St John's College, Cambridge. He taught the top mathematics class in St Paul's School in London from 1885 to 1911.  His students included J. E. Littlewood and G. N. Watson.

In 1928 Macaulay was elected Fellow of the Royal Society.

Publications

References

1862 births
1937 deaths
19th-century English mathematicians
20th-century English mathematicians
Algebraic geometers
Alumni of St John's College, Cambridge
Fellows of the Royal Society
People educated at Kingswood School, Bath